New Era is the debut studio album of Nigerian recording artist Kiss Daniel. Originally scheduled to be released on 1 May 2016, the album was however released on 14 May 2016 through G-Worldwide Entertainment, the album contains hit singles "Woju", "Laye", "Good Times" and "Mama".

Background and release
Kiss Daniel began recording New Era in 2014 following the release of "Woju" on 3 September 2014. The album's cover art and track list were revealed on 14 March 2016 and 3 May 2016 respectively. The album contains 20 songs with only label mate Sugarboy making vocal appearance.

On 15 May 2016, an album concert promoting the release of the album was organized at Eko Hotel and Suites with notable and established entertainers like 2face Idibia, Vector, Cynthia Morgan, Tekno Miles, Yemi Alade, Ayo Makun, Wande Coal, Banky W, Patoranking, Burna Boy in attendance.

Commercial performance
Upon its release, New Era debuted at #8 on the Billboard World Album Chart in the week of 4 June 2016.

Critical reception

Upon its release, New Era was met to positive critical reviews among music critics in the local media. Aribaba of Jaguda gave the album 4 stars out of 5, stating that: "New Era, ironically does well in attempting to usher in a new era of pop music in Nigeria. A new set of expectations, and a new standard....For this, we say a big Kudos to Kiss Daniel and his team". In the same vein, Tola Sarumi, a music critic and analyst for notJustOk, was full of praise on the production of the album; further stating that: "Listening to this album is a pleasure; the imageries he manages to evoke, his composure and complex melodies all serve to remind that pop music can be well considered and produced with longevity as an
outcome".

Accolades
New Era won Album of the Year and Best R&B/Pop Album at The Headies 2016.

Track listing

Personnel

Musicians 
Sugarboy – featured artist

Charts

Release history

References

2016 albums
Kiss Daniel albums
Yoruba-language albums
Albums produced by Young John (producer)
Albums produced by DJ Coublon
G-Worldwide Entertainment albums